The Masonic Boys School (sometimes Masonic Orphan Boys School) was a school in Dublin, Ireland which was originally established for the sons of deceased, or financially distressed, freemasons. It was directly supported by the Brethren of the Masonic Order and was in existence from 1867 until 1981.

The school was located at Richview in Clonskeagh for most of its existence from 1885 to 1980 in what is as of 2023 the University College Dublin's School of Architecture.

History
Following the earlier establishment of the Masonic Female Orphan School of Ireland, the establishment of a boys school was decided upon at a meeting in Freemason's Hall on Molesworth Street on the 16th of April 1867.

Sport at the school
The school won the Leinster Cricket Union Senior schools cup on a number of occasions in its history.

The school were runners-up in the Leinster Schools Junior Cup in Rugby on one occasion in 1927.

School campus

Adelaide Hall, Sandymount
The school was established in 1867 and originally operated from Adelaide Hall in Sandymount which it leased from 1873 but moved because of overcrowding to a new site at Richview Lodge in Clonskeagh in 1885.

Richview, Clonskeagh
After some alterations and extensions of Richview Lodge in the 1880s by the architect Sir Thomas Drew, the school finally commenced for the first time from the new campus at Richview, Clonskeagh on the 16th of January 1888.

In 1980, UCD bought Richview Lodge and its estate of 17.4 acres for £2.1million and the school closed soon after.

Notable alumni

Alan Buchanan - Anglican bishop
George Campbell RHA - painter
Derek Fielding - author
Edward Seymour - cricketer
James Wills - cricketer

See also
Grand Lodge of Ireland

References

Former Secondary schools in Dublin (city)
Educational institutions established in 1867
Freemasonry in Ireland
Masonic educational institutions